

Furuyama Moromasa (Japanese: 古山師政, act. ca. 1695-1748) was a Japanese ukiyo-e painter and print artist, active during the 18th century.

Life and works
Few details of his life have survived. He was born in Edo (Tokyo), the son of the artist Furuyama Moroshige, who in turn was the son of the master artist Hishikawa Moronobu but established his own lineage, the Furuyama School.

Moromasa designed woodblock prints with genre scenes of ordinary life, sporting contests, activities in the Yoshiwara district and similar subjects. He was one of the first Japanese artists to use linear perspective, a technique first used to show interiors, such as tea houses, in a genre known as uki-e. This was likely done under the influence of megane-e (vedute) from Europe and China. He also produced paintings in the popular category of 'beautiful women' (bijin-ga).

Moromasa's most famous work is a pair of handscroll paintings depicting the theater district (Azuma yarō; owned by Central Library, Edinburgh) and brothel district (Shinobu-yama; owned by Museo Stibbert, Florence) of Edo, measuring 13 meters and 16 meters long respectively.

He was active until around the mid-1700s and wrote several texts on the subject of engraving.

See also
 Schools of ukiyo-e artists

Further reading 
 Lane, Richard. (1978).  Images from the Floating World, The Japanese Print. Oxford University Press. 
 Newland, Amy Reigle. (2005). Hotei Encyclopedia of Japanese Woodblock Prints. Amsterdam: Hotei. 
内田欽三「古山師政の研究—今治市河野美術館蔵『歌舞伎遊楽図屏風』をめぐって」『専修大学人文科学年報』第30号　2000年
バックランド・ロジーナ「古山師政筆「芝居町吉原遊郭図巻」について」国華1466号 2018年

References

External links 

 Woodblock prints by Furuyama Moromasa @ ukiyo-e.org

18th-century Japanese artists
Ukiyo-e artists
Japanese engravers
Japanese wood engravers